The Carterfone is a device invented by Thomas Carter.  It manually connects a two-way radio system to the telephone system, allowing someone on the radio to talk to someone on the phone. This makes it a direct predecessor to today's autopatch.

Description
The device was acoustically, but not electrically, connected to the public switched telephone network.  It was electrically connected to the base station of the mobile radio system, and got its power from the base station.  All electrical parts were encased in bakelite, an early plastic.  

When someone on a two-way radio wished to speak to someone on phone, or "landline" (e.g., "Central dispatch, patch me through to McGarrett"), the station operator at the base would dial the telephone number. When callers on the radio and on the telephone were both in contact with the base station operator, the handset of the operator's telephone was placed on a cradle built into the Carterfone device.  A voice-operated switch in the Carterfone automatically switched on the radio transmitter when the telephone caller was speaking; when they stopped speaking, the radio returned to a receiving condition.  A separate speaker was attached to the Carterfone to allow the base station operator to monitor the conversation, adjust the voice volume, and hang up their telephone when the conversation had ended.

Landmark regulatory decision  

This particular device was involved in a landmark United States regulatory decision related to telecommunications.  Twelve years earlier, a court had ruled in the Hush-A-Phone case that devices could mechanically connect to the telephone system (such as a rubber cup attached to a phone-company-owned telephone) without the permission of AT&T. In 1968, the Federal Communications Commission extended this privilege by allowing the Carterfone and other devices to be connected electrically to the AT&T network, as long as they did not cause harm to the system.  This ruling, commonly called "the Carterfone decision" (13 F.C.C.2d 420), created the possibility of selling devices that could connect to the phone system using a protective coupler and opened the market to customer-premises equipment.  The decision is often referred to as "any lawful device", allowing later innovations like answering machines, fax machines, and modems (which initially used the same type of manual acoustic coupler as the Carterfone) to proliferate.

In February 2007, a petition for rulemaking was filed with the FCC by Skype, requesting the FCC to apply the Carterfone regulations to the wireless industry—which would mean that OEMs, portals and others will be able to offer wireless devices and services without the cellular operators needing to approve the handsets.  However, on April 1, 2008, FCC chairman Kevin Martin indicated that he would oppose Skype's request. On April 17, 2015 this petition for rulemaking was dismissed without prejudice by the FCC at the request of Skype's current owner, Microsoft Corporation.

See also
 Autopatch
 Acoustic coupler
 Hush-a-Phone v. United States
 Interconnection
 Modem
 Cordless telephone
 Terminal equipment
 Telephone
 Radio
 Citizens band radio

References

External links
 Full text of FCC Carterfone decision
 Full text of Skype petition
 Cybertelecom :: Customer Premises Equipment - FCC Regulations concerning attachment and marketing of CPE
 Timeline from NPR
ArsTechnica: Any lawful device - 40 years after the Carterfone decision (includes picture of the Carterfone)
 Carterfone: My Story, by Nicholas Johnson, FCC Commissioner, 1966-73

Telephony equipment
Federal Communications Commission
History of telecommunications in the United States
AT&T litigation